Yves-Thibault de Silguy (born 22 July 1948) is a French and European politician, born in Rennes, France. He served in the Santer Commission and was in charge of Economic and Financial Affairs. He was a member of the Club de l'horloge.

Political career
Before moving to the European Commission in 1995, de Silguy served as chief adviser on European Union affairs to Prime Minister Édouard Balladur from 1993 to 1995. During his time as Commissioner, he managed the introduction of the Euro.

Following the resignation of the Santer Commission, France did not renominate de Silguy.

Later career
In 2000, de Silguy became a member of the Executive Board of Suez Lyonnaise des Eaux and later served as Chief Executive Officer of Suez from 2001 to 2003. He was then Executive Vice-President of Suez from 2003 until June 2006.

Other activities

Corporate boards
 VTB Bank, Independent Member of the Supervisory Council (since 2013)
 Autoroutes du Sud de la France (ASF), Member of the Board of Directors
 Solvay, Member of the Board of Directors (since 2011)
 Sofisport, Chairman of Supervisory Council
 LVMH, Independent Member of the Board of Directors (since 2009)
 Vinci SA, Vice Chairman of the Board of Directors (since 2006), Chairman of the Board of Directors (2006-2010)

Non-profit organizations
 MEDEF International, Vice-Chairman

References

1948 births
Living people
Carrefour de l'horloge people
French European Commissioners
Directors of LVMH
Businesspeople from Rennes
Politicians from Rennes
University of Rennes alumni
Sciences Po alumni
École nationale d'administration alumni